Santo Richard Loquasto (born July 26, 1944) is an American production designer, scenic designer, and costume designer for stage, film, and dance.

His work has included the films Big, Radio Days,  Cafe Society, Blue Jasmine, Desperately Seeking Susan, Alice, and Zelig. His work on stage is extensive and includes Hello, Dolly!, Movin' Out, Fosse, Ragtime, The Cherry Orchard, Grand Hotel, Cafe Crown, the ballet Don Quixote, Glengarry Glen Ross, and Fences.

Loquasto has won a British Academy Film Award, five Drama Desk Awards, and has garnered four Tony Awards. He has been nominated for three Academy Awards and a total of twenty-three Tony Awards. In 2004, Loquasto was inducted into the American Theater Hall of Fame.

Education and career
Loquasto has a bachelor's degree in English literature from King's College, Pennsylvania and a master's of fine arts from Yale Drama School. He started his career as a designer at the Showcase Theatre in Wilkes-Barre, Pennsylvania.

After working in regional theater since 1969, Loquasto has worked on approximately 100 Broadway productions, either as scenic designer, costume designer, or both. His first Broadway production was Sticks and Bones in 1972, and his most recent productions have been Carousel and The Iceman Cometh, both in 2018. He has received 21 Tony Award nominations for his work as either costume or scenic designer, and has won four times. He has won the Drama Desk Award for Outstanding Set Design three times, and the Drama Desk Award for Outstanding Costume Design once.

Loquasto has been a production designer for many Woody Allen films, and was nominated for the Academy Award for his production design for Allen's Bullets over Broadway and Radio Days, and for costume design for Zelig.

Loquasto is a first cousin of Indy car driver Al Loquasto and a distant cousin of civil engineer and author Angelo F. Coniglio. The family is descended from Libertino lo Guasto, a foundling born in Serradifalco in 1796.

Tony Awards
Best Costume Design:
 1977: The Cherry Orchard (tied with Theoni V. Aldredge for Annie)
 1990: Grand Hotel: The Musical
 2017: Hello, Dolly!

Best Scenic Design:
 1989: Cafe Crown

Selected theatre credits
1972 – Sticks & Bones
1972 – That Championship Season
1975 - Kennedy's Children
1978 – King of Hearts
1979 – Bent
1990 – Grand Hotel, The Musical
2005 – Glengarry Glen Ross
2007 – 110 in the Shade
2009 – Waiting For Godot
2016 – Shuffle Along
2017 – Hello, Dolly! (2017 revival)
2018 – Carousel (revival)
2018 – The Iceman Cometh (revival)
2019 – Gary: A Sequel to Titus Andonicus

References

External links

Santo Loquasto: list of works at filmreference.com
 W.H. Crain Costume and Scene Design Collection at the Harry Ransom Center

1944 births
American costume designers
American people of Italian descent
American production designers
American scenic designers
Best Production Design BAFTA Award winners
Ballet designers
Drama Desk Award winners
King's College (Pennsylvania) alumni
Living people
People from Wilkes-Barre, Pennsylvania
Tony Award winners
Yale School of Drama alumni